Locos por el Sexo is the debut album of noise rock band Tragic Mulatto, released in 1987 by Alternative Tentacles.

Release and reception 

Ira Robbins of the Trouser Press gave considerable praise to Locos por el Sexo, saying that the "taste-is-no-obstacle lyrics are funnier than a poke in the eye with a sharp stick" and that "fans of the vulgar but hysterical could do worse than to bathe in this delectable cesspool."

Despite never being individually issued on CD, five out of eight of the album's songs can be found on the Italians Fall Down and Look Up Your Dress compilation album.

Track listing

Personnel 
Adapted from the Locos por el Sexo liner notes.

Tragic Mulatto
 Gail Coulson (as Flatula Lee Roth) – vocals, saxophone, tuba
 Lance Boyle (as Reverend Elvister Shanksley) – bass guitar, vocals, harmonica, mixing, cover art
 Tim Carroll (as Richard Skidmark) – guitar
 Jay Smith (as Jazzbo Smith) – drums

Additional musicians and production
 Garry Creiman – engineering
 John Cuniberti – mixing

Release history

References 

1987 debut albums
Alternative Tentacles albums
Tragic Mulatto (band) albums